Duke Ping of Jin (died 532 BC) was from 557 to 532 BC the ruler of the State of Jin, a major power during the Spring and Autumn period of ancient China. His ancestral name was Ji, given name Biao, and Duke Ping was his posthumous name. He succeeded his father, Duke Dao of Jin, who died in 558 BC.

Battle of Zhanban
In 557 BC, soon after Duke Ping ascended the throne, Jin fought its last major battle with its traditional enemy Chu at Zhanban (湛阪, in present-day Pingdingshan, Henan Province). Chu was defeated and lost all of its territory north of Fangcheng. The Battle of Zhanban marked the end of the eight-decade-long Jin-Chu rivalry, as a weakened Chu would be consumed by numerous wars with its new enemy Wu, culminating in the 506 BC Battle of Boju, when the Wu army would capture and destroy the Chu capital Ying.  Meanwhile, Jin would increasingly be riven by internal strife that would ultimately lead to its partition into the new states of Han, Zhao, and Wei.

Battle of Pingyin
In 555 BC Duke Ling of the State of Qi switched his alliance from Jin to its enemy Chu.  In response, Duke Ping invaded and inflicted a crushing defeat on Qi.  The Jin army occupied large swathes of Qi territory, besieged the Qi capital Linzi, and burned down the outer portion of the city.

Rebellion of Luan Ying
In 550 BC Jin general Luan Ying (欒盈) from the powerful Luan clan rebelled at Quwo with support from Duke Zhuang II of Qi. Aided by the Wei clan, Luan's forces captured the capital Jiang (綘), before being defeated by the Jin army. Luan Ying was killed at Quwo and the Luan clan was exterminated. Two years later Jin attacked Qi again for supporting Luan's rebellion.

Death and succession
Duke Ping reigned for 26 years and died in 532 BC. He was succeeded by his son Yi, Duke Zhao of Jin.

References

Monarchs of Jin (Chinese state)
6th-century BC Chinese monarchs
532 BC deaths
Year of birth missing